Edward Busk may refer to:

 Edward Henry Busk (1844–1926), Vice Chancellor of London University
 Edward Teshmaker Busk (1886–1914), English pioneer of early aircraft design